Charles Geoffrey "Geoff" Coleman (born 1 October 1938) is a former Australian politician.

He was born in Melbourne, and was a livestock and real estate agent before entering parliament. In 1976 he was elected to the Victorian Legislative Assembly as the Liberal member for Syndal. Defeated in 1982, he returned in 1985 and was appointed Shadow Minister for Natural Resources in 1990. In 1992 his seat was abolished and he moved to the seat of Bennettswood. With the Coalition's victory in that election, Coleman was appointed Minister for Natural Resources, serving until 1996. He retired from parliament in 1999.

References

1938 births
Living people
Liberal Party of Australia members of the Parliament of Victoria
Members of the Victorian Legislative Assembly
Politicians from Melbourne